Events from the year 1962 in Canada.

Incumbents

Crown 
 Monarch – Elizabeth II

Federal government 
 Governor General – Georges Vanier
 Prime Minister – John Diefenbaker
 Chief Justice – Patrick Kerwin (Ontario)
 Parliament – 24th (until 19 April) then 25th (from 27 September)

Provincial governments

Lieutenant governors 
Lieutenant Governor of Alberta – John Percy Page   
Lieutenant Governor of British Columbia – George Pearkes 
Lieutenant Governor of Manitoba – Errick Willis 
Lieutenant Governor of New Brunswick – Joseph Leonard O'Brien  
Lieutenant Governor of Newfoundland – Campbell Leonard Macpherson 
Lieutenant Governor of Nova Scotia – Edward Chester Plow 
Lieutenant Governor of Ontario – John Keiller MacKay 
Lieutenant Governor of Prince Edward Island – Frederick Walter Hyndman
Lieutenant Governor of Quebec – Paul Comtois 
Lieutenant Governor of Saskatchewan – Frank Lindsay Bastedo

Premiers 
Premier of Alberta – Ernest Manning   
Premier of British Columbia – W.A.C. Bennett 
Premier of Manitoba – Dufferin Roblin  
Premier of New Brunswick – Louis Robichaud 
Premier of Newfoundland – Joey Smallwood 
Premier of Nova Scotia – Robert Stanfield 
Premier of Ontario – John Robarts 
Premier of Prince Edward Island – Walter Shaw 
Premier of Quebec – Jean Lesage  
Premier of Saskatchewan – Woodrow Lloyd

Territorial governments

Commissioners 
 Commissioner of Yukon – Frederick Howard Collins (until May 1) then Gordon Robertson Cameron
 Commissioner of Northwest Territories – Robert Gordon Robertson

Events
March 21 – The birth-defect-causing drug thalidomide is banned
May 2 – The Canadian dollar is pegged to the U.S. currency
June 18 – In the 1962 Federal election John Diefenbaker's Progressive Conservative Party of Canada is reduced to a minority government
July 1 – First medicare plan is launched in Saskatchewan to great protest by doctors
July 30 – Trans-Canada Highway opens
August 6 – A Premiers Conference is held in Victoria, British Columbia
September 1 – Place Ville Marie opens in Montreal
September 29 – Alouette 1, Canada's first satellite, is launched.
October 25 – The Bedford Institute of Oceanography opens in Nova Scotia
October 25-November 12 – The Cuban Missile Crisis occurs.  Diefenbaker refuses to put  Canadian forces on alert, angering the U.S. government.
December 11 – The last two hangings in Canada take place.
The Globe and Mail adds the Report on Business section

Arts and literature

New books
Max Aitken – The Decline and Fall of Lloyd George
W. O. Mitchell – The Kite
Marshall McLuhan – The Gutenberg Galaxy
George Woodcock – Anarchism
Farley Mowat – The Black Joke
Thomas B. Costain – The Last Plantagenets

Awards
See 1962 Governor General's Awards for a complete list of winners and finalists for those awards.
Stephen Leacock Award: W. O. Mitchell, Jake and the Kid

Television
Mister Rogers' Neighborhood premieres on CBC

Theatre
The first Shaw Festival opens

Sport
April 22 – The Toronto Maple Leafs win their tenth Stanley Cup by defeating the Chicago Black Hawks. 
May 7 – The Ontario Hockey Association's Hamilton Red Wings win their only Memorial Cup by defeating the Central Alberta Hockey League's Edmonton Oil Kings 4 games to 1. The deciding Game 5 was played at Barton Street Arena in Hamilton, Ontario
December 1–2 – The Winnipeg Blue Bombers win the Grey Cup in the famous fog bowl.

Births

Unknown date
Perry Bellegarde, national chief of the Assembly of First Nations (2014–present)

January to June
January 17 – Jim Carrey, comedian and actor
January 22 – Kevin Lamoureux, politician
February 4 – Michael Riley, actor
February 23 – John Hatch, basketball player
February 27 – Susie Moloney, novelist
March 20 – Ross Young, politician (d. 2021)
March 21 – Kathy Greenwood, actress and comedian
March 27 – Jann Arden, singer-songwriter
March 29 – John Martin Crawford, serial killer (d. 2020)
April 1 – John Wallace, rower and Olympic gold medallist
April 11 – Colin Carrie, politician
May 5 – Manoj Sood, actor
May 31 – Corey Hart, musician
June 12 
 Camilla Scott, Canadian actress
 Jordan Peterson, author, clinical psychologist and professor of psychology
June 23
 Chris Collins, politician
 Pat Kelly, ice speed skater

July to December
July 7 – Ross Rutledge, field hockey player (d. 2004)
July 12 – Camilla Scott, actress and television host
July 14 – Diane Ratnik, volleyball player
July 21 – Lee Aaron, rock and jazz singer
August 8 – Mike Zanier, ice hockey player
August 23 – Martin Cauchon, politician and Minister
August 27 – Adam Oates, ice hockey and lacrosse player
August 29 – Ian James Corlett, voice actor and producer
August 31 – Wanda Guenette, volleyball player
September 11 – Andrew Jackson, voice actor
September 14 – Robert Herjavec, Croatian-born Canadian businessman, investor and author  
September 15 – Brad Willock, volleyball player
September 18 – John Mann, rock musician and actor (d. 2019)
September 22 – Normand D'Amour, actor
September 24 – Nia Vardalos, actress, screenwriter and producer
September 28 – Grant Fuhr, ice hockey player
October 16 – Dan McTeague, politician
October 30 – Rex Harrington, ballet dancer
November 8 – Cliff Cullen, politician
November 9 – Teryl Rothery, actress
November 12 – Mark Hunter, ice hockey player, coach, and manager
December 4 – Julie Lemieux, Canadian voice actress
December 28 – Michelle Cameron, synchronized swimmer

Deaths
January 12 – James Garfield Gardiner, politician, Minister and Premier of Saskatchewan (b. 1883)
January 24 – James Charles Brady, politician (b. 1876)
March 3 – Cairine Wilson, Canada's first female Senator (b. 1885)
August 20 – Joseph-Arsène Bonnier, politician (b. 1879)
August 26 – Vilhjalmur Stefansson, Arctic explorer and ethnologist (b. 1879)
October 23 – John Thomas Haig, politician (b. 1877)
November 13 – Télesphore-Damien Bouchard, politician (b. 1881)
November 21 – Frank Amyot, sprint canoer and Olympic gold medalist (b. 1904)
December 8 – Allison Dysart, politician, lawyer, judge and 21st Premier of New Brunswick (b. 1880)
December 22 – Solon Earl Low, politician (b. 1900)

See also
 1962 in Canadian television
 List of Canadian films

References

 
Years of the 20th century in Canada
Canada
1962 in North America